Yucaipa High School is a public high school in Yucaipa, California, United States that serves the cities of Yucaipa and Calimesa and the community of Oak Glen, 65 miles east of Los Angeles.

History
The original Yucaipa High School campus is now used as the Oak View High School and Education Center. The campus moved to its current location on Yucaipa Blvd. in 1970 and now houses grades 9–12. The 50th Anniversary of Yucaipa High was celebrated in 2009 at the Yucaipa High School 9th Grade Campus (now OVEC) on 6th St. in Yucaipa, CA.

Design and structures
The Yucaipa High School campus consists of the A, C, D, E, F, G, H, I, L, M, N, O, P, and Q buildings, Multi-Purpose Room, Gymnasium, and Boys and Girls Locker Rooms. In the summer of 2007, a new artificial turf football field was completed.

Student publications
The student-produced news magazine, The Epigraph, has been published and distributed by the Journalism class since August 2000.

Extracurricular activities

Band
Two types of band classes are offered at Yucaipa High School: Symphonic Band and Concert Band. Concert band is a required course for all 9th grade and beginning musicians wishing to advance to the Symphonic Band. Music appreciation is also offered, giving students basic grounding in music history, music theory, and the playing of the recorder. Extra-curricular band activities include the Yucaipa High School Jazz Band, and the award-winning marching band, the Thunderbird Marching Regiment. The current director of bands is Robert Presler.

Choir
Varsity Choir and Madrigals are choir classes at Yucaipa High School, also under the direction of Robert Presler. The Madrigal choir is the highest level auditioned vocal ensemble at Yucaipa High School and has performed at the Forbidden City Concert Hall in Beijing, China during spring of 2008.

Drama
The Yucaipa High School Theater program offers students award-winning opportunities. In the 2005–2006 school year, they successfully performed Les Misérables and Deadwood Dick; in the 2006–2007 school year they performed West Side Story and Hamlet; and in the 2007–2008 school year they plan to perform Twelfth Night and the musical 1776. They have been chosen to attend Edinburgh, Scotland in the Fringe Festival in 2008 and annually enter into the California Educational Theatre Association.

Forensics
The Yucaipa High School Forensics (Speech and Debate) Program is a course run by Yucaipa High Government – AP European History teacher John Eichman. As a member of the National Forensics League, Southern California District #10, the team of about 40 competes in various tournaments throughout California.

Clubs
Best Buddies Club
Alive Club (Christian Club)
Invisible Children
Block Y
Club Otaku
Interact Club
iMatter Club
Key Club
Leo Club
French Club
International Thespian Society Troupe #960
Drama Club
A# (Choral Booster Club)
Book Club
Friends of Rachel Club
Engineering Club
Secular Student Alliance
YHS Game Club
Gay-Straight Alliance

Sports
Yucaipa recently joined the Citrus Belt League.

Fall Season (September–November)
Football
Girls Volleyball
Cross Country Running
Girls Tennis
Boys Water Polo
Girls Golf
Cheerleading

Winter Season (December–February)
Girls Water Polo
Boys Basketball
Girls Basketball
Boys Soccer
Girls Soccer
Wrestling
Cheerleading

Spring Season (March–May)
Golf
Baseball
Softball
Badminton
Boys Track and Field
Girls Track and Field
Boys Swimming
Girls Swimming
Boys Tennis
Boys Volleyball
Cheerleading

Notable alumni
Susan Anton – Actress, Miss California 1969

Matt Carson – MLB Player the Oakland Athletics
Matt Davidson – MLB player for the Arizona Diamondbacks
Corky Miller – MLB player for the Cincinnati Reds Minnesota Twins Boston Red Sox Atlanta Braves Chicago White Sox
Brett Roy -- NFL player for the New York Jets
Mark Teahen – MLB Player for the Toronto Blue Jays Kansas City Royals Chicago White Sox
Taijuan Walker – MLB player for the New York Mets
Kent Walton – MLB player for the Oakland Athletics
John Eshleman – MLB player for the San Francisco Giants
Tyler Wells – MLB player for the Baltimore Orioles

References

External links
 Official website
 

High schools in San Bernardino County, California
Public high schools in California
Calimesa, California
Yucaipa, California
Educational institutions established in 1958
1958 establishments in California